Flavinarosa is a genus of moths of the family Limacodidae.

Species
Flavinarosa acantha Solovyev, 2010
Flavinarosa alius Solovyev & Witt, 2009
Flavinarosa glaesa Solovyev & Witt, 2009
Flavinarosa holoxanthia (Hampson, 1900)
Flavinarosa kozyavka Solovyev, 2010
Flavinarosa luna Solovyev, 2010
Flavinarosa obscura (Wileman, 1911)
Flavinarosa paucispina (Holloway, 1986)
Flavinarosa ptaha Solovyev, 2010

References 

 , 2010: Review of the genus Flavinarosa Holloway (Zygaenoidea: Limacodidae) with description of four new species. Nota Lepidopterologica 32 (1): 115 – 126.
 , 2009: The Limacodidae of Vietnam. Entomofauna Suppl. 16: 33-229.

Limacodidae genera
Limacodidae
Insects